Wilson is a lunar impact crater that lies in the southern part of the Moon's near side, to the southwest of the large walled plain Clavius. It is nearly attached to the southeastern rim of the slightly larger crater Kircher. Almost due east lies Klaproth, another walled plain.

This crater has a heavily eroded outer rim that now forms an irregular rise about the relatively level interior floor. The flooded remains of a crater intrudes part way into the rim and inner wall along the south-southeastern section. Several other small craters lie along the eastern and northern rim. The narrow section of surface between Wilson and Kircher is irregular and contains a small, cup-shaped crater that joins both outer rims. The interior floor is marked by a number of tiny craterlets of various dimensions, and there is a small crater along the edge of the eastern inner wall.

Satellite craters 

By convention these features are identified on lunar maps by placing the letter on the side of the crater midpoint that is closest to Wilson.

References 

 
 
 
 
 
 
 
 
 
 
 
 

Impact craters on the Moon